Thung Yang is a village and tambon (sub-district) of Laplae District, Uttaradit Province, Thailand. In 2005 it had a population of 11,121 people. The tambon contains ten villages.

References

Tambon of Uttaradit province
Populated places in Uttaradit province